The following is a list of the municipalities (comuni) of Molise, Italy.

There are 136 municipalities in Molise (as of January 2019):

84 in the Province of Campobasso
52 in the Province of Isernia

List

References

Istituto Nazionale di Statistica

 
Geography of Molise
Molise